Kinderhook Township is a civil township of Branch County in the U.S. state of Michigan. As of the 2010 census, the township population was 1,497.

Communities 
There are no incorporated municipalities within the primarily agricultural township. There are settlements in three communities:

Geography
There are several lakes in the township. Those in the west drain into the Prairie River, while those in the south drain into the Fawn River. Coldwater Lake, located in the northeast of the township, drains into the Coldwater River.

Demographics
As of the census of 2000, there were 1,614 people, 643 households, and 500 families residing in the township. The racial makeup of the township was 96.72% White, 0.31% African American, 0.62% Native American, 0.06% Asian, 0.06% Pacific Islander, 1.18% from other races, and 1.05% from two or more races. Hispanic or Latino of any race were 1.49% of the population.

There were 643 households, out of which 30.5% had children under the age of 18 living with them, 68.7% were married couples living together, 5.1% had a female householder with no husband present, and 22.2% were non-families. 18.0% of all households were made up of individuals, and 7.6% had someone living alone who was 65 years of age or older.  The average household size was 2.51 and the average family size was 2.83.

In the township the population was spread out, with 23.2% under the age of 18, 6.2% from 18 to 24, 27.0% from 25 to 44, 27.8% from 45 to 64, and 15.7% who were 65 years of age or older.  The median age was 42 years. For every 100 females, there were 103.3 males.  For every 100 females age 18 and over, there were 103.1 males.

The median income for a household in the township was $45,903, and the median income for a family was $50,474. Males had a median income of $33,922 versus $24,583 for females. The per capita income for the township was $21,801.  About 3.9% of families and 5.1% of the population were below the poverty line, including 6.6% of those under age 18 and 3.8% of those age 65 or over.

References

External links
Kinderhook Township official website

Townships in Branch County, Michigan
Townships in Michigan